The Warsaw Spire is a complex of neomodern office buildings in Warsaw, Poland constructed by the Belgian real estate developer Ghelamco.

Description
It consists of a 220-metre main tower with a hyperboloid glass facade, Warsaw Spire A, and two 55-metre auxiliary buildings, Warsaw Spire B and C.
The main tower is the third tallest building in Warsaw and also the third tallest in Poland.

The European Border and Coast Guard Agency (FRONTEX) has been headquartered in the 6th to 13th floors of the building since 2012.

In December 2014, a large neon sign with the words "Kocham Warszawę" ("I love Warsaw") was installed by Belgian creative lighting and visual design practice Painting with Light and placed on the upper floors of the partially constructed main tower. 
The building was topped out in April 2015. 
The neon sign was removed in early July 2015 due to progress in façade assembly.
A more advanced version of the sign returned permanently to the top of the tower in May 2016, for the opening of the building.

Awards
In 2017, the building received the MIPIM Award for Best Office and Business Development in the world during the MIPIM International Property Fair in Cannes, France.

See also
 List of tallest buildings in Poland

References

External links

Skyscraper office buildings in Warsaw
Wola
Office buildings completed in 2016